For a more in-depth discussion of the topic go here: Homosexuality in American Football.

This is a list of notable, openly lesbian, gay, bisexual, pansexual, transgender, and queer-identifying athletes associated with American Football, namely the NFL. This includes those who were posthumously outed.

List of professional players 

*Posthumously revealed to have been gay.

**First active NFL player to come out.

†First openly gay player to be drafted by the NFL (did not make it onto the roster by the start of the playing season).

‡First openly gay man to play in a regular season game in the CFL

△Played in a Regular Season Game

▲Attended Training Camp

List of collegiate players 

*First active collegiate football player to publicly come out.

References 

LGBT players of American football
Lists of American football players
LGBT-related lists